The Colorado Department of Local Affairs (DOLA) is the principal department of the Colorado state government responsible for local government assistance, property taxation, property assessment appeals, affordable housing, and housing construction regulation.

Structure 
DOLA is composed of 4 divisions:

Board of Assessment Appeals 
 Hears appeals filed by real and personal property owners regarding property tax assessments.

Division of Housing 
 Provides state and federal funding to private housing developers, housing authorities and local governments to increase the inventory of affordable housing.
 Offers Section 8 rental assistance statewide through local housing authorities and non-profit service organizations.
 Certifies all factory/manufactured structures built in or shipped to Colorado.
 Approves multifamily construction in counties with no construction codes.

Division of Local Government 
 Provides technical assistance and information to local governments on available federal and state programs
 Acts as a liaison with other state agencies concerned with local governments.
 Performs research on local government issues.
Division of Property Taxation 
 Coordinates and administers the implementation of property tax law throughout the 64 counties.
 Operates under the leadership of the property tax administrator, who is appointed by the Colorado State Board of Equalization.

References

External links 
 

Local Affairs